The Get-Away is a 1941 film directed by Edward Buzzell. It stars Robert Sterling, Charles Winninger and Donna Reed. It is a remake of Public Hero No. 1.

Plot

Cast

Robert Sterling as Jeff Crane
Charles Winninger as Doctor Josiah Glass
Donna Reed as Maria Theresa 'Terry' O'Reilly 
Henry O'Neill as Warden Alcott
Dan Dailey as Sonny 'Dinkie' Black 
Don Douglas as Jim Duff
Ernest Whitman as 'Moose'
Grant Withers as Parker
Chester Gan as Sam

References

External links

1941 films
1941 crime drama films
American crime drama films
American black-and-white films
1940s English-language films
Remakes of American films
Films directed by Edward Buzzell
Films scored by Daniele Amfitheatrof
Metro-Goldwyn-Mayer films
1940s American films